The Reflecting God Study Bible is an out-of-print study Bible published by Zondervan in conjunction with the Christian Holiness Partnership, an ecumenical organization of denominations in the holiness movement. A Methodist revision of the NIV Study Bible, it utilizes the New International Version. Its general director, Dr. Wayne McCown, was assisted by 22 other contributors.

See also

The Wesley Study Bible, another Methodist study Bible

References 

Methodism
Arminianism
Free Methodist Church
New International Version
Study Bibles
Zondervan books